Shyam Kumar Bansal (born 7 July 1940) is an Indian former Test and One Day International cricket umpire from India. He officiated in six Test matches, 30 ODIs, one women's Test match, and two women's ODIs.

See also
 List of Test cricket umpires
 List of One Day International cricket umpires

References

1940 births
Living people
People from Delhi
Indian Test cricket umpires
Indian One Day International cricket umpires